Digital reset or digitally reset may refer to:

 Digital reset (computing), the reset of a digital computer
 Digital reset (electronics), a cleared latch-state in electronics
 Digital reset (typesetting), a digitally prepared typeset for publication either from a previous digital typeset or a complete rework of a work previously published with traditional typeset

See also
 Digital set (disambiguation)
 Reset (disambiguation)